Caledonian Thebans Rugby Football Club is Scotland's leading inclusive rugby club and represents Scotland in international rugby union tournaments for inclusive teams.

Established in 2002, the Thebans are based at Edinburgh's Murrayfield Stadium and have over 50 registered players. The club supports its players and supporters – whether gay or straight, experienced or new to the game – to enjoy rugby at a competitive level.

Through twice-weekly coaching sessions and regular matches against both mainstream and inclusive clubs (whose members are often drawn from the LGBT community), the Thebans aim to develop confident players and encourage participation in rugby union from groups who may have been under-represented in the sport.

History 
The Thebans was formed as a club primarily for gay and bisexual men who wanted to play rugby, but may have lacked the confidence to join a mainstream team. The club came to life on 18 May 2002 when Colm Cunningham, a gay man from Northern Ireland, put up a poster in the Laughing Duck – a now defunct Edinburgh gay bar.

In 2006 the club became more performance orientated. Since then, the Thebans have gone from strength to strength and now benefit from extensive facilities at Roseburn Park. The club's playing squad now also includes a diverse mix of gay, bisexual and straight players – reflecting the Thebans' aim of promoting inclusion and encouraging participation in the game.

In February 2016, the club played its first competitive fixture against Glasgow Alphas RUFC, the second inclusive team to be formed in Scotland.

International competition 
Caledonian Thebans RFC has represented Scotland at international tournaments for inclusive clubs since 2002.

The Thebans have been most successful at the biennial Union Cup, the European championships for inclusive teams.  In the 2014 tournament, held in Brussels, a strong Thebans squad finished as runners-up in the Silver Plate final – losing 8–7 to hosts Straffe Ketten.

May 2016 saw the Thebans travel to Nashville, Tennessee to fight for inclusive rugby's world cup, the Bingham Cup, which takes place every second year.  Unable to attend the 2014 tournament, held in Sydney, the Thebans are raising funds to send a full squad to Bingham 2020 to ensure Scotland is once again represented in this global competition.
In 2016 we won the Hoagland Cup in Nashville, Tennessee.

Affiliation
The Thebans are affiliated to the Scottish Rugby Union and are also part of umbrella club Murrayfield Wanderers RFC, with whom the club has built strong ties. The Thebans are also part of the International Gay Rugby Association and Board.

Name
The club's name is a reference to the Sacred Band of Thebes, an elite and highly successful military unit in the Theban army of ancient Greece, which was made up of male couples. The Sacred Band of Thebes was completely annihilated, however, by Alexander the Great under Philip II of Macedon in the Battle of Chaeronea in 338 BC.

References

External links

Scottish rugby union teams
Rugby union in Edinburgh
International Gay Rugby member clubs
Sports teams in Edinburgh